Local elections were held in Kakamega County to elect a Governor and County Assembly on 4 March 2013. Under the new constitution, which was passed in a 2010 referendum, the 2013 general elections were the first in which Governors and members of the County Assemblies for the newly created counties were elected.

Gubernatorial election

Prospective candidates
The following are some of the candidates who have made public their intentions to run: 
 Wycliffe Oparanya - Minister Planning Development and Vision 2030
 Soita Shitanda  - Minister Housing
 Paul Olando - former Nyanza Provincial Commissioner 
 Albert Mwilitsa - former Turkana North District Commissioner 
 Simbauni Ndombi - businessman 
 Suleiman Sumba - former Kenya army officer

References

 

2013 local elections in Kenya